Everything Live is an edited recording of the Welsh rock band Manic Street Preachers performing at the Manchester NYNEX on 24 May 1997. Accompanying the album Everything Must Go, it captures the band's comeback following the disappearance of their lyricist Richey Edwards and their transition to a major band. On the tenth anniversary edition of Everything Must Go, bassist Nicky Wire cites the concert as the moment he knew that the band had "made it".

The recording was released as a VHS video on 29 September 1997, and the full concert was released on DVD as part of the Everything Must Go 20th Anniversary Edition reissue.

Everything Live was directed by Dick Carruthers. The first 12,000 copies came with five postcards featuring photographs of the band by their official photographer Mitch Ikeda.

Track listing 
 "Introduction: A Design For Life (Stealth Sonic Orchestra Mix)"
 "Everything Must Go"
 "Enola/Alone"[*]
 "Faster"
 "Kevin Carter"
 "La Tristesse Durera (Scream To A Sigh)"
 "Removables"[*]
 "Roses In The Hospital"
 "Elvis Impersonator: Blackpool Pier"
 "The Girl Who Wanted To Be God"[*]
 "Motown Junk"
 "Motorcycle Emptiness"
 "No Surface All Feeling"
 "This Is Yesterday"
 "Small Black Flowers That Grow In The Sky"[*]
 "Raindrops Keep Fallin' On My Head"[*]
 "Yes"[*]
 "Australia"
 "Stay Beautiful"[*]
 "A Design for Life"
 "You Love Us"

[*] Only included on the Everything Must Go 20th Anniversary Edition DVD Disc 1

It also includes an exclusive interview and documentary footage interspersed between songs.

References 

Manic Street Preachers video albums
1997 live albums
1997 video albums
Live video albums
Manic Street Preachers live albums